Ramsbottom is a surname and may refer to:

Alan Ramsbottom (born 1936), British racing cyclist
Alfred Ramsbottom, American soldier who fought in the American Civil War
Caleb Ramsbottom (1769–1827), English lightweight boxer
Greg Ramsbottom, Irish football player
Henry Ramsbottom (1846–1905), English cricketer
James Ramsbottom, birth name of Charles Melville (1828–1867), Union Navy sailor in the American Civil War, recipient of the Medal of Honor
James Kirkham Ramsbottom (1891–1925), English botanist
John Ramsbottom (engineer) (1814–1897), English mechanical engineer
John Ramsbottom (MP) (1778–1845), British Whig politician and landowner
John Ramsbottom (mycologist) (1885–1974), British mycologist
Neil Ramsbottom (born 1945), English football player
Neville Ramsbottom-Isherwood (1905–1950), New Zealand born Royal Air Force test pilot and commanding officer
Richard Ramsbottom (1749–1813), British Tory politician
Sue Ramsbottom (born 1973), Irish sportswoman

Fictional
Albert Ramsbottom and his parents feature in several monologues performed by Stanley Holloway
Silas Ramsbottom, supporting character in the Despicable Me franchise
Wendolene Ramsbottom, in A Close Shave, a 1995 Wallace and Gromit animated film

See also
Ramsbottom, market town in the Metropolitan Borough of Bury, Greater Manchester, England
Ramsbottomia, genus of fungi in the family Pyronemataceae
Ramsbottom Carbon Residue, a method used in the petroleum industry to calculate the carbon residue of a fuel
Ramsbottom Valve, a safety valve used in a thermal-hydraulics plant

English toponymic surnames